John Seville Higgins (April 14, 1904 - December 28, 1992) was bishop of the Episcopal Diocese of Rhode Island, serving from 1953 to 1954 as coadjutor and from 1955 to 1972 as diocesan.

Biography
Higgins was born on April 14, 1904, in London, England. He studied at Oberlin College and graduated in 1928. He trained for the ordained ministry at the Western Theological Seminary and graduated in 1931. He was ordained deacon on May 1, 1931, and priest on November 1 of the same year. He served parishes in Nevada, Illinois and Minnesota and in 1948 became rector of St Martin's Church in Providence, Rhode Island.

He was elected Bishop Coadjutor of Rhode Island in November 1952 and consecrated on February 4, 1953, by Presiding Bishop Henry Knox Sherrill. He succeeded Granville Bennett as diocesan Bishop of Rhode Island on January 1, 1955. During his time as bishop, particularly in the 50s, the diocese experienced rapid growth. Bishop Higgins was also instrumental in rebuilding of the diocesan headquarters in Providence. His spirit of ecumenism was effective in creating the Rhode Island State Council of Churches. He retired on June 1, 1972, and died 20 years later in 1992.

References 
Episcopal Dictionary of the Church

1904 births
1992 deaths
20th-century American Episcopalians
Episcopal bishops of Rhode Island
20th-century American clergy